Hülya Avşar (b. 10 October 1963) is a Turkish actress, singer, businesswoman, and former beauty pageant titleholder. She is best known for numerous films and hit revenge series "Kadın İsterse". Her international roles include Safiye Sultan in Muhteşem Yüzyıl: Kösem and as Fatmagül in film Fatmagül'ün Suçu Ne?.

Education and career
She graduated from Ankara Cumhuriyet Lisesi and started swimming professionally for DSI. In 1982, she and her family moved to Istanbul. Avşar attended a beauty pageant organized by Bulvar magazine, which she finished first. Later, the organization revoked her crown when it was discovered that she had been married for a brief period. In 1983, she debuted as an actress in the movie Haram. In the following years, she starred in over 70 films and won the Best Actress prize in the 18th Moscow International Film Festival. In addition to this, she launched a singing career that saw a nationwide concert tour, the release of eight albums and two singles.

In 2000, Avşar won the Best Female Singer award by Kral TV. Later that same year, she wrote for Günaydın newspaper as a columnist. Avşar was also the editor of Hülya (a monthly magazine). She plays tennis on an amateur basis and won a championship in the TED 2001 tennis tournament. She is also a television personality who served as a coach and judge for the first two seasons of The Voice from 2011 through 2013.

Avşar also has been a judge on Turkey's Got Talent since 2009. Hülya Avşar was the editor-in-chief of the magazine Hülya, a position she has held for eight years. She is also the founder of the Turkish "by H" luxury brand, not to be confused with the similarly named New York-based clothing store.

Personal life
Hülya Avşar was born in Hasköy, Ardahan, to a Kurdish father from Höçvan Hasköy, Ardahan and a Turkish mother from Edremit. A part of her maternal family is of Ottoman Turkish descent who immigrated from Crete, Greece. Other part of her maternal family is of Yörük descent, which is a Turkic ethnic subgroup. In a television show she told that her father's Kurdish name is Ello, and her Kurdish birth name is Malakan. In 1979 Avşar married Mehmet Tecirli, an engineering student; however, they divorced shortly after. Avşar married for a second time in 1997 to Kaya Çilingiroğlu which ended in divorce in 2005; they have one daughter named Zehra. She has also dated former 1987-88 European Golden Shoe football player Tanju Çolak and businessman Sadettin Saran between 2007-10.

Discography

Studio albums 
 Her Şey Gönlünce Olsun (13 June 1989)
 Hatırlar Mısın? (1 October 1990)
 Hülya Gibi (20 October 1991)
 Dost Musun Düşman Mı? (18 March 1993)
 Yarası Saklım (27 December 1995)
 Hayat Böyle (June 1998)
 Aşıklar Delidir (10 May 2002)
 Haute Couture / Kişiye Özel (October 2009)
 Aşk Büyükse (5 October 2013)

Singles 
As lead artist
 Sevdim (April 2000)
 Geçmiş Olsun (August 2011)
 Saymadım Kaç Yıl Oldu (July 2019)
 Sen Aşk Mısın? (April 2022)
 Duydun Mu? (June 2022)
 Yapma Aşkım (August 2022)
 Anlatma (December 2022)

As featured artist
 Sen Olmazsan (with Rafet El Roman) (March 2017)

Filmography

Films

TV series

TV programs 

 Çek Bakalım
 Alaturka Solist
 Hülya Avşar Soruyor, Habertürk TV – (2009–2011)
 Hülya Avşar Show, TNT Show TV Kanal D TGRT – 1996–2011
 Hülya Avşar'la Sen Bilirsin, ATV – 2006
 Pişti, Show TV – 2006
 Hülya Avşar Stüdyosu, BeIN GURME
 Kadınlar ve Erkekler, ATV – 2007
 Yetenek Sizsiniz Türkiye, Show TV Star TV TV8 – 2009–2014, 2017–
 O Ses Türkiye, Show TV Star TV – 2011–2013
 Hülya Avşar, TV8 – 2014–2015
 Bir Hülya Avşar Sohbeti, Star TV – 2017–2018
 Hülya Avşar Show, YouTube – 2020–

References

External links 
 
 

 

! colspan="3" style="background:;" | Moscow International Film Festival

1963 births
Living people
People from Ardahan
Turkish television actresses
Turkish women musicians
Turkish film actresses
Turkish classical musicians
Turkish folk musicians
Turkish people of Kurdish descent
20th-century Turkish actresses
Turkish television personalities
Turkish television talk show hosts